Florence Wilson may refer to:

 Florence Austral, Australian opera singer (maiden name)
 Florentius Volusenus, which can be translated as Florence Wilson, Scottish humanist
 Florence Wilson (figure skater), Canadian figure skater in Canadian Figure Skating Championships
 Mary Florence Wilson (1884–1977) American librarian for the League of Nations
 Romer Wilson, pen-name of Florence Roma Muir Wilson